Cheung Lek Mei, sometimes transliterated as Cheung Lik Mei, is a village in Fo Tan, Sha Tin District, Hong Kong.

Administration
Cheung Lek Mei is a recognized village under the New Territories Small House Policy. It is one of the villages represented within the Sha Tin Rural Committee. For electoral purposes, Cheung Lek Mei is part of the Fo Tan constituency, which was formerly represented by Lui Kai-wing until July 2021.

History
The village historically shared a single higher earthgod shrine with Kau To, Ma Niu and Ma Liu Shui. All were part of the Fo Tan Yeuk.

The population of the village comprised about 9 to 12 households and a total of 47 people in 1911.

See also
 Kau To Hang
 Kau Yeuk (Sha Tin)
 Tai Po Kau Nature Reserve

References

Further reading

External links
 Delineation of area of existing village Cheung Lek Mei (Sha Tin) for election of resident representative (2019 to 2022)
 Webpage about Cheung Lek Mei (in Chinese)

Fo Tan

Villages in Sha Tin District, Hong Kong